Coláiste Chiaráin (in English: the College of St. Kieran), also known as Leixlip Community School, is a co-educational community school in Leixlip established in 1980 under the trusteeship of the Presentation Sisters, the Archbishop of Dublin and Co Kildare VEC. It has over 570 students and about 50 staff including office staff, teachers and two caretakers. Coláiste Chiaráin's motto, in Irish, is "Tús Feasa Fiafraí" which means "enquiry is the beginning of knowledge".

Location 
Situated roughly northwest of Leixlip town, it was built to educate the expanding population of the Dublin Metropolitan Area, to which Leixlip although strictly in County Kildare is part of. This rapid growth and need for education has since slowed, leading to Colaiste Chiarain no longer replacing retired teaching staff.

Facilities
Coláiste Chiaráin adjoins a local Gaelic Athletic Association (GAA) with which it shares pitch facilities. In total the school has 1 GAA pitch, 1 soccer pitch, 2 tennis courts and 2 basketball courts.

Further reading
 Coláiste Chiaráin: A 25 Year Anniversary (published by the school, printed by Mullen Print)

References

Leixlip
Secondary schools in County Kildare
Irish-language schools and college
Community schools in the Republic of Ireland
1980 establishments in Ireland
Educational institutions established in 1980